Pedicularis densiflora, known commonly as Indian warrior or warrior's plume, is a plant in the family Orobanchaceae.

Indian warrior is native to California and Oregon in western North America and is found in chaparral, forests, California oak woodlands at low elevations.

Description
Pedicularis densiflora is a perennial herb with stout, green or sometimes reddish or magenta stems and fern-shaped leaves, and long spikes of deep red to bright pink flowers with toothed petals.

Like others of its genus, it is a root parasitic plant, attaching to the roots of other plants to obtain nutrients and water. This species is a facultative parasite, or hemiparasite, in that it can live without attaching to another plant but will parasitize if presented with the opportunity. It often parasitizes plants of the heath family, such as manzanita.

References

External links
Jepson Manual Pedicularis densiflora
USDA Plants Profile
Pedicularis densiflora Photo gallery

densiflora
Flora of California
Flora of Oregon
Flora of the Cascade Range
Flora of the Klamath Mountains
Flora of the Sierra Nevada (United States)
Natural history of the California chaparral and woodlands
Natural history of the California Coast Ranges
Natural history of the Channel Islands of California
Natural history of the Peninsular Ranges
Natural history of the San Francisco Bay Area
Natural history of the Santa Monica Mountains
Natural history of the Transverse Ranges
Medicinal plants of North America
Taxa named by George Bentham
Taxa named by William Jackson Hooker
Flora without expected TNC conservation status